Li Congjun (born October 1949) is the former President of China's Xinhua News Agency. He retired in December 2014 and was replaced by Cai Mingzhao.

Biography
Li was born in Liu'an, Anhui Province. He started working in October 1968, and joined the Communist Party of China (CPC) in May 1983. In 1985, he obtained a doctorate in literature from the department of Chinese literature of Shandong University.

He became a standing committee member of the CPC Zhejiang committee and the director of the CPC propaganda department of Zhejiang in January 1999. He became vice director of the CPC central propaganda department in February 2001. In August 2007, he was appointed to the position of CPC party chief and vice president of Xinhua News Agency, and in March 2008 was promoted to president of that agency.

He is a member of the 18th Central Committee of the Communist Party of China and was a member of the 17th Central Committee of the Communist Party of China. He is also a member of the education, science, culture and health committee of the National People's Congress.

References 

Living people
1949 births
Members of the 17th Central Committee of the Chinese Communist Party
Members of the 18th Central Committee of the Chinese Communist Party
Members of the Standing Committee of the 10th National People's Congress
Members of the 12th Chinese People's Political Consultative Conference
Shandong University alumni
People's Republic of China politicians from Anhui
Chinese Communist Party politicians from Anhui
Politicians from Lu'an
Xinhua News Agency people